Feline leukemia virus subgroup C receptor-related protein 1 is a protein that in humans is encoded by the FLVCR1 gene (SLC49A1).

References

Further reading